Future Problem Solving Program International (FPSPI), originally known as Future Problem Solving Program (FPSP), and often abbreviated to FPS, is a non-profit educational program that organizes academic competitions in which students apply critical thinking and problem-solving skills to hypothetical future situations. The program looks at current technological, geopolitical, and societal trends and projects those trends 20–30 years into the future in order to train students to develop solutions to the challenges they may face as adults. FPSPI was founded by creativity researcher Ellis Paul Torrance in 1974. Today, thousands of students from over 20 countries participate in the program each year. Most FPSPI components are open to students who are in the equivalent of the U.S. grade level range of 4 through 12.

Structure 

FPSPI consists of state and nationwide organizations called affiliates. Each affiliate is responsible for conducting the competitions which take place in its own geographic area. Students begin preparing for competition at the start of each school year. Depending on the affiliate and the type of competition, there may be regional, state, or national levels of competition that take place during the year. Only the winners of any given competition qualify to proceed to the next level. The highest level of competition takes place at the annual International Conference (IC), which is held in May or June, at the end of the United States school year. The IC is held at the campus of a public university in the United States (the country with the largest number of competitors), with a new location being chosen every two years.

Pedagogy 

FPSPI was originally founded to train students to use a specific six-step problem-solving process:

 Identify challenges that exist in a given situation.
 Pick a high-impact "Underlying Problem" to focus on, formulated as an attainable goal that addresses the problem.
 Brainstorm solutions to the Underlying Problem.
 Develop criteria that measure solutions' positive impact on people affected by the Underlying Problem.
 Evaluate and rank the solutions using the criteria.
 Develop an elaborated Action Plan based on the highest-ranking solution.

The original Future Problem Solving competition—now known as Global Issues Problem Solving (GIPS)—evaluates students' competency in using this problem-solving process in the context of a fictional future situation. Students in the GIPS competition are grouped into grade level ranges and may compete as individuals or as teams of four. Prior to each competition event, FPSPI announces the competition topic (such as "Artificial Intelligence" or "Oceans") and provides a list of suggested readings. Students spend 1–2 months researching the topic with an eye to potential future challenges and solutions. At the beginning of the competition, students are given a Future Scene (FS), a one- to two-page document that describes the hypothetical future situation having to do with the pre-announced topic. Competitors then proceed according to the six-step process. Students are graded on their correct application of the process and on their use of cited research and creative originality. After completing the six-step process in two hours, students then immediately begin work on a second competition called "Presentation of Action Plan" in which they illustrate their final solution by preparing and performing a skit.

FPSPI later developed additional programs that make use of the six-step problem-solving process, or that otherwise train students in creative critical thinking. In the Community Problem Solving (CmPS) competition, students are evaluated on how well they apply the process to present-day problems in their own community. The Action-based Problem Solving (AbPS) program adapts the process for classroom use. In the Scenario Writing competition, students write a short story, set at least 20 years in the future, based on one of the GIPS competition topics. The Scenario Performance component is similar but is geared toward students who prefer telling stories through oral communication.

Topic History 

Each year, FPSPI releases a list of five study topics, one for each of the five GIPS competitions that occur each academic year.

Notable alumni 

 Allison Schroeder, Academy Award-nominated screenwriter

References

External links 
 Future Problem Solving Program International

Educational programs
Problem solving
Learning programs
Educational organizations based in the United States
International non-profit organizations